"A Thousand Miles" (originally titled "Interlude") is the debut single by American pop singer Vanessa Carlton. Produced by Curtis Schweitzer and Ron Fair, the song was released as the lead single for Carlton's album Be Not Nobody (2002). First released to US radio in February 2002, it became Carlton's biggest hit in the United States and her only single to reach the top 10 of the Billboard Hot 100, peaking at number five. The song also experienced commercial success worldwide, reaching number one in Australia, the top five in Ireland, and the top 10 in the United Kingdom, France, Italy, and the Netherlands.

Background
"A Thousand Miles" is a piano-driven pop song supported by a string orchestral arrangement. Carlton says that the song was inspired by a crush she had on a Juilliard student (who is now a "very famous actor") whom she met while she was attending The School of American Ballet. She further stated that because she never actually spoke to her crush due to her shyness, she felt like she had "a better chance of falling up than ever having a relationship with this person".

She has also called the song "a combination of reality and fantasy. It's about a love that so consumes you that you do anything for it. That's how I felt at that time."

Composition and recording
"A Thousand Miles" is written in the key of B major and composed with a tempo of 95 beats per minute. Carlton wrote the song's piano riff in the summer of 1998 at her parents' house in Philadelphia; her mother, who had been listening to her, said, "Vanessa, that's a hit song." Carlton was unable to finish the song because of a case of writer's block, and did not return to it for several months. While looking for a record label that would sign her, Carlton played the beginning of the song for a record producer, who said, "You have to finish that." She returned to her parents' home and finished it in an hour one evening, naming it "Interlude."

Some years later, Carlton recorded a demo tape (which featured several tracks, including "Interlude") and sent it to various producers and labels in the hopes that one would sign her. Some expressed interest, but Carlton did not agree with their suggestions for alternative titles for the song. One of the tapes found its way to Ron Fair, head of A&M Records, who recalled that "It was extraordinary, but also in some respects kind of screwed up as a record. It didn't press the emotional buttons the way I envisioned it." Carlton met with Fair for a piano session to alter the arrangement of the song, "so the heartbeat came in a different way", Fair said.

During the session, more transitions were inserted into the song, and the timing of the repetition of the chorus was changed. Additionally, the instrumental opening was shortened and an orchestra section was added by Fair; the lyrics, however, remained the same. He explained: "It has a lot of starts and stops to it, which makes it hard to achieve a flow, but I wanted to make a really dramatic record. The song is like a mini musical of its own." "A Thousand Miles" took 14 sessions to record, and was the first song recorded for Be Not Nobody. As well as conducting the orchestra, Fair also organized a small band for its recording: John Goux played guitar on the track, Leland Sklar played bass guitar, and Abe Laboriel, Jr. played drums. Carlton later said, "after listening to it I realized I was going to make an album that I was very proud of."

The selection of the song's title was accompanied by a minor disagreement between Carlton and Fair, who was reportedly "adamant" about changing it. Fair said, "Vanessa Carlton is an incredible talent, but she's also very stubborn... I had to say, 'Look, I'm the president of the label, we're not calling it "Interlude". ' When you're trying to launch a career, people need a handle to pick things up from, and the word 'Interlude' is never in the song". In its finished form, the song was first heard during a scene in the Reese Witherspoon film Legally Blonde (2001), and was featured on the film's soundtrack under the title "A Thousand Miles (Interlude)". The final title of the song, "A Thousand Miles", was based on a suggestion by Fair's nephew. After the song's completion, Fair said that he listened to it repeatedly and "it made me weep. That's usually my litmus test. If I cry, I know it's a hit".

Despite this, he was concerned that the song's piano basis would put it at a disadvantage in the marketplace if it were to be released as a single. Fair played "A Thousand Miles" in front of his superior Jimmy Iovine, the co-chairman of Interscope-Geffen-A&M. Iovine was very impressed with the song, and requested that a music video be filmed immediately for it. After the video had been completed it was presented to Tom Calderone, the Vice President of Programming for MTV, in early 2002. Calderone expressed a desire to begin broadcasting the video at once and Fair agreed to his request, even though the album was still in production at the time and Carlton's marketing "image" had not yet been developed.

Promotion and chart performance
In the United States, "A Thousand Miles" debuted on the Billboard Hot 100 later that month; it peaked at number five for three weeks in May and remained on the chart for 41 weeks. The album Be Not Nobody was released on April 30 and, partly because of the popularity of "A Thousand Miles", debuted in the U.S. top five with first-week sales of over 101,000 copies. It was 2002's sixth most-played single on U.S. radio (ranking sixth on the Hot 100 2002 year-end chart), and sold well in other countries (where it was promoted and released over the summer months). It was a top-five hit in Ireland and France, and managed to reach the top ten in other parts of Europe such as the United Kingdom, Italy, and the Netherlands. It was most popular in Australia, where it became the sixth most successful single of the year and held the number-one position on the ARIA Singles Chart for two weeks, from August 11 to 24. It replaced a Junkie XL remix of "A Little Less Conversation" by Elvis Presley, and was itself replaced by Avril Lavigne's "Complicated". It also reached the top 20 in Germany. E! Online said the song was "a bona fide hit for good reason. Catchy pop on the surface, it has melodic complexity beneath that bodes well for repeated listening". It failed to chart in Japan.

Carlton told the website Contactmusic.com of the first time she watched the single's music video, in which she is seen playing the piano while traveling through a variety of settings:

It received heavy airplay on the channel following its premiere on the top-ten video program Total Request Live on January 4, 2002, and was popular enough to be retired from the show's countdown. There was speculation that bluescreen techniques had been utilized during its creation, but according to Carlton it was "100 percent real"; she also said she felt that Marc Klasfeld (the video's director) "captured who I was in that video", and he was selected to direct the video for the album's follow-up single, "Ordinary Day".

Both the album and single were given substantial promotion on the Internet. AOL Music reported that a 20-minute selection of video content involving Carlton that the website had hosted, including the "A Thousand Miles" video and Carlton's performance of the song for Sessions@AOL, drew over one million requested downloads and streams prior to the release of Be Not Nobody. The Sessions recording of "A Thousand Miles" was later included on the album Sessions @ AOL, released in October 2003.

Critical reception
The song was highly acclaimed by music critics. Billboard magazine opined, "it's the song's classical-tied piano hook that endures with urgency throughout the song that lends it spectacular charm, along with the artist's vulnerable vocal style... A truly auspicious opening." Most other critics gave Be Not Nobody mixed reviews, but generally praised the song. AllMusic wrote: "as it moves from its solo orchestral-backed choruses, the result isn't overwhelming, it's sweet, multi-layered, and appealing". Sean Richardson of the Boston Phoenix made favourable comparisons between "A Thousand Miles" and Michelle Branch's debut single "Everywhere", saying, "it's a good-natured reverie, with none of the troubled soul searching that characterizes the work of Tori and Fiona. She occasionally evokes her piano-playing predecessors by raising her girlish voice to a howl, but she's better off being herself". Adrien Begrand of PopMatters magazine said the song was "catchy and hard to dislike", but characterized it as "the sort of girly-voiced, introspective pop that is made to please people who are looking for singer/songwriters who look and sound profound, but actually have nothing to say".

"A Thousand Miles" continued to receive regular rotation on Adult Contemporary and Adult Top 40 radio stations two years after its original release, and Billboard magazine has named it "one of the most enduring songs of the millennium". Carlton has said that rappers such as Fabolous and Ja Rule "really like this song."

In the film White Chicks (2004) a group of girls refer to the song as their "jam" when it's played on the radio. It's played again two more times in the film: when Terry Crews' character sings this song to Marlon Wayans' character, and when Terry Crews' character sings it to the Wilson twins. Terry Crews' character in the film sings along with it and shakes his head hard when he hears the orchestrated hook. The song is also prominently featured in the Season 3 finale titled "Flashback in the Day" of the television sitcom Workaholics.

Music video
Directed by Marc Klasfeld, the music video was filmed in Newbury Park, California, and in portions of Downtown Los Angeles. There was no use of green screen or visual effects, only a custom built dolly for the piano and a safety belt on Carlton. It begins with Carlton entering her garage and uncovering her piano. When she starts playing and the song begins, the piano starts to move  through the neighborhood outside. While playing, she passes by bikers and footracers on the road, near a parade downtown, along the beach, and across other parts of the city, gradually taking place until the sun sets. In the end, she and the piano finally return to her garage, where she gets up and reenters the house.

Awards and nominations
"A Thousand Miles" won in the Can't Get You Out of My Head category at the VH1 Big in 2002 Awards, and it was nominated for three Grammy Awards: Record of the Year, Song of the Year and Best Instrumental Arrangement Accompanying Vocalist(s). It lost Song of the Year and Record of the Year to Norah Jones' "Don't Know Why", while the Best Instrumental Arrangement Accompanying Vocalist(s) award went to "Mean Old Man", performed by James Taylor. The song became popular amongst U.S. troops serving in Iraq, and in April 2003 the Chicago Sun-Times reported that it had become the most requested song on the radio station British Forces Broadcasting Service Middle East. Carlton responded, "Perhaps, 'A Thousand Miles' conveys the feelings and longing and desperation that the U.S. soldiers feel for their loved ones. I don't know. But whatever peace I am able to bring to the hearts of the people at war is a contribution that I am proud of". By May 2003 the website Musicnotes had sold a record 10,000 pieces of digital sheet music for "A Thousand Miles", and it won the website's "Song of the Year" award. The song's production team was nominated for a 2003 Technical Excellence & Creativity Award in the category of Outstanding Creative Achievement in Record Production — Single or Track.

Legacy
First appearing as a sample in the original soundtrack of the 2001 film Legally Blonde, the song is Carlton's most successful single, and her only top twenty hit in the U.S.; her next highest peaking single, "Ordinary Day", went no higher than number thirty on the Billboard Hot 100. Carlton told VH1 in 2004, "I just sit down and write my songs ... It just kind of happened and it will never happen again like that." A writer for the Boston Phoenix said that with the song, Carlton "won favor with smart but awkward teenage girls who didn't see themselves in more evidently constructed teen-pop personalities like Britney Spears and Christina Aguilera", and Slant magazine said it "helped pave the way for an industry beginning to take a turn away from bubblegum pop". "A Thousand Miles" has been covered by numerous artists, including Christian Lee Hutson, Icarus the Owl, Victoria Justice, David Archuleta, Ronan Parke, the Glee cast, and Terry Crews.

Formats and track listings

Personnel
Vanessa Carlton – vocals, piano
Abe Laboriel, Jr – drums
John Goux – guitar
Leland Sklar – bass guitar
Ron Fair – strings arrangement

Charts

Weekly charts

Year-end charts

Decade-end charts

Certifications and sales

Release history

See also
 List of number-one singles in Australia in 2002
 2002 in music

References

2002 debut singles
Music videos directed by Marc Klasfeld
Number-one singles in Australia
Vanessa Carlton songs
2000s ballads
Song recordings produced by Ron Fair
Songs written by Vanessa Carlton
Pop ballads
2001 songs
A&M Records singles
Baroque pop songs